Bäke may refer to:

 Bäke (Telte), a river of Berlin and Brandenburg, Germany
 Franz Bäke (1898–1978), German officer and tank commander during World War II

See also

 Varreler Bäke, a river in north Germany